Internet video (online video / cloud-based video) is the general field that deals with the transmission of digital video over the internet. Internet video exists in several formats, the most notable being MPEG-4i AVC, AVCHD, FLV, and MP3.

There are several online video hosting services, including YouTube, as well as Vimeo, Twitch, and Youku. In recent years, the platform of internet video has been used to stream live events. As a result of the popularity of online video, notable events like the 2012 U.S. presidential debates have been streamed live on the internet. Additionally, internet video has played an important role in the music industry as a medium to watch music videos and gain popularity for songs

Video file formats

Practical online video streaming was only made possible with advances in data compression, due to the impractically high bandwidth requirements of uncompressed video. Raw digital video requires a bandwidth of 168Mbit/s for SD video, and over 1Gbit/s for FHD video.

MPEG-4 AVC (Advanced Video Coding)

H.264/MPEG-4 AVC is the most widely used video coding format on the Internet. It was developed in 2003 by a number of organizations.

AVCHD (Advanced Video Coding High Definition)

AVCHD, or Advanced Video Coding High Definition, uses one of the more efficient video coding formats. It was announced in May 2006 and since then has grown into a high-quality video format that can compete with other professional forms of media. The AVCHD is geared towards consumer shooters; this is largely because the AVCHD format capitalizes on the H.264/MPEG-4 video that is able to compress video to smaller sizes in order to allow more video to be stored in the same storage capacity.

FLV (Flash Video)

Flash Video (FLV) is video encoded by Adobe Flash software in order to play within the Adobe Flash Player. Popular in the past, and used by several video sites, including YouTube, the Adobe Flash Player has been replaced by HTML5 and this format has been abandoned.

MPEG-4 Part 14 (MP4)

MPEG-4 is known as a sharing format for the internet. In recent years an increasing number of camcorder and cameras began employ it. Moreover, YouTube recommends using the MP4 Format (Although it accepts multiple formats, YouTube either converts them to .flv or .mp4 files). Apple is another company that has backed MP4 by using it in its QuickTime player.

YouTube

YouTube was founded in 2005 by Chad Hurley, Steve Chen, and Jawed Karim. The first video on the platform was "Me at the zoo" uploaded by Karim on the first YouTube channel, jawed, in April 2005.

In October 2005, Nike became the first major company to embrace YouTube as a promotional platform. They were the first company to do this and since then YouTube has provided a means of displaying internet video in order to help companies promote their products. Google purchased YouTube for $1.65 billion in October 2006 and since then it has developed it even further. Since then, it has become the most popular website for watching internet video. For example, the hours of video watched per month on YouTube totaled  6 billion. As of 2014, there were one billion unique users to YouTube each month. According to Nielsen, YouTube reaches more U.S. adults aged 18–34 years old than any cable network.

Other video platforms

Aside from YouTube, there are several other internet video platforms, which despite being less popular, are still used by many. Vimeo is a key example of this. Vimeo has over thirty million registered members and has a global reach of over 170 million each month. Their mission statement is to “empower and inspire people around the world to create, share, and discover videos”. Another online internet video platform which was founded in June 2012 is Vine. It involves a short video on a six-second loop. Once the "Vine" is uploaded, it can be published on social media. Social media played a large role in making this a more popular internet video service.

Live streaming

Live streaming is another important aspect of internet video. This is when particular events are streamed using a live form of internet video. A key example of this is that in 2008 and 2012, during the Presidential election, the debates between the two candidates were live-streamed on YouTube.

Live streaming has also been used as a means of promoting exposure for a particular product or business. This is largely because platforms such as YouTube provide a cheap, and usually free, means to access millions of users. Whether that be potential customers on laptops, smartphones, tablets, and smart TVs. A study conducted by SocialMediaExaminer supports this hypothesis using YouTube as a particular example.

A sign of the growth of importance of internet video live streaming refers to the change in business model of the World Wrestling Entertainment (WWE). Previously the WWE’s business model involved receiving huge numbers of pay-per-view buys for special events hosted once per month and charging approx. $44.95 (Dependent on retailer) for each. However, in February 2014 they launched a 24/7 streaming network charging $9.99 per month in order to get access to every "special event". This shows that one of the largest entertainment companies was willing to adopt to a live streaming/internet video model in order to support their business. Many other companies such as BBC (with iPlayer), ITV (with ITV Player) and Channel 4 (with 4oD) have made use of internet video to allow users to livestream content, or watch on demand later.

Controversy

Both live streaming and internet videos have faced controversy in recent years, largely because it is extremely difficult to access all the live-streams which show particular events. This infringes on the issue of copyright. Rights-holders face the challenge of content, which includes audio, TV shows and sporting events, being streamed live to the public. As a result, streaming website Justin.TV partnered with content matching service Vobile in order to filter out infringing material. Another example of a copyright issue which occurred to online streaming was when uStream were sued by a boxing promoter in August 2009 for allowing 2,337 users to view a broadcast of the fight Roy Jones Jr. vs Omar Sheika.

YouTube has also faced issues surrounding copyright. For example, in December 2013, many YouTubers who published footage of video games for either review or tutorial purposes were punished and crippled by copyright claims. In the past, YouTube has also faced issues with the music industry over users publishing videos without the permission of the music industry. The issues can be seen by the fact that since 2007, YouTube has paid out one billion dollars to copyright holders. Saying that, the formation of Vevo has aided YouTube in terms of issues with the music industry by allowing artists/labels to get a share of revenue.

The importance of video in the music industry

The growth of internet video has provided a platform to help elevate the music industry. This has most particularly been seen through the platform of YouTube. Chris Maxcy, YouTube’s partner development director stated that “YouTube is the ideal place for labels to promote music and for fans to discover new artists and old favourites”. Moreover, Rio Caraeff, who heads up Universal’s digital group described YouTube as a “revenue stream, a commercial business. It's growing tremendously. It's up almost 80 percent for us year-over-year in the U.S. in terms of our revenue from this category”. In addition, an article published in 2011, believes that YouTube has changed the music industry citing three ways; YouTube allows people to listen to the native music of India, for example, and other regions which would otherwise be difficult to discover. Brittany Wong also believes that YouTube allows people to get discovered. This is largely because it allows anybody to post an online video for the world to see. Finally, it mentions that the convenience of the platform allows many people to listen to music, which has increased potential audiences.

Mike Masnik, the CEO and founder of Techdirt, recognized the importance of YouTube in the music industry. In this article he recognizes the potential ability of YouTube in order to allow musicians to increase exposure, and record labels to make money. However, they were naïve and did not fully embrace it.

See also

 History of the internet
 Live streaming
 Livestreamed news
 Over-the-top media service
 Streaming media
 Video clip
 Webcast
 YouTube

References

Video